Samuel McKinlay Stewart (1 May 1920 – 1995) was a Scottish professional footballer, who played for East Fife in the Scottish Football League. Stewart played for East Fife during a successful period, as the club won the Scottish League Cup three times in the late 1940s and early 1950s.

Stewart scored two goals for the club. One came on his debut against East Stirlingshire on 27 August 1938 at Bayview after 4 minutes. The second was against  the same club, again at Bayview, on 6 April 1960. A gap of 21 years and 223 days.

References

1920 births
1995 deaths
Date of death missing
Sportspeople from Musselburgh
Scottish footballers
Association football fullbacks
East Fife F.C. players
Scottish Football League players
Tranent Juniors F.C. players
Scottish Junior Football Association players
Footballers from East Lothian